Grynex martini is a species of beetle in the family Cerambycidae. It was described by Allard in 1894. It is known from Australia.

References

Homonoeini
Beetles described in 1894